Nizhneulu-Yelga (Tübänge Oloyılğa) is a rural locality (a selo) and the administrative centre of Nizhneulu-Yelginsky Selsoviet, Yermekeyevsky District, Bashkortostan, Russia. The population was 335 as of 2010. There are 3 streets.

Geography 
Nizhneulu-Yelga is located 5 km southeast of Yermekeyevo (the district's administrative centre) by road. Novonikolayevka is the nearest rural locality.

References 

Rural localities in Yermekeyevsky District